Aristolochia ringens is a species of perennial plant in the family Aristolochiaceae. It is found from Panama through Bolivia, Colombia, and Venezuela.

References

External links

ringens